Admiral Sureesh Mehta, PVSM, AVSM (born August 18, 1947) served as 19th Chief of the Indian Navy from 31 October 2006 until 31 August 2009. He was succeeded by Nirmal Kumar Verma. He is the first service chief from India's armed forces to be born post Indian Independence. He is married to Maria Teresa Mehta and they have two children.

Early life
Admiral Mehta was born on 18 August 1947. He studied in the National Defence Academy before joining the Indian Navy. Later, he also graduated from the Defence Services Staff College and the National Defence College.

Military career
After graduating, Admiral Mehta joined the Fleet Air Arm of the Indian Navy, where he flew the Hawker Sea Hawk off the aircraft carrier, . He was the Flag Officer Commanding Western Fleet during the Kargil War. Later, he served as the Flag Officer Commanding-in-Chief (FOC-in-C) of the Eastern Naval Command (ENC) from 30 September 2005 till his appointment as the Naval Chief. He was appointed as the Chairman of the Chiefs of Staff Committee (COSC) on 28 September 2007.

Awards and distinctions
In 1995, Admiral Mehta was awarded the Ati Vishist Seva Medal. In 2005, he received the Param Vishist Seva Medal.

High Commissioner to New Zealand
After retirement, the Indian government appointed him as India's High Commissioner to New Zealand.

Awards and decorations

See also
Chief of Naval Staff of the Indian Navy

References

http://www.bharat-rakshak.com/NAVY/Navy-Chiefs/Chiefs-Navy21.html

|-

Chiefs of the Naval Staff (India)
Indian Navy admirals
Directors General of the Indian Coast Guard
Flag Officers Commanding Western Fleet
1947 births
High Commissioners of India to New Zealand
Living people
Chiefs of Personnel (India)
Indian naval aviators
Recipients of the Param Vishisht Seva Medal
Recipients of the Ati Vishisht Seva Medal
Defence Services Staff College alumni
National Defence College, India alumni